Elmwood Township is a former township of Boone County, Arkansas, USA.  Its last appearance on the US Census was in 1950.

Population history

References
 United States Census Bureau 2008 TIGER/Line Shapefiles
 
 United States National Atlas

External links
 US-Counties.com
 City-Data.com

Townships in Boone County, Arkansas
Townships in Arkansas